Across from Midnight is the sixteenth studio album by Joe Cocker, released in 1997.

Track listing 
 "Tonight" – 4:49 (Max Carl, Greg Sutton)
 "Could You Be Loved" – 5:47 (Bob Marley)
 "That's All I Need to Know" – 4:05 (Graham Lyle, Eros Ramazzotti, Vladi Tosetto)
 "N'Oubliez Jamais" – 4:43 (Jim Cregan, Russ Kunkel)
 "What Do I Tell My Heart?" – 5:00 (Rick Neigher, John Shanks)
 "Wayward Soul" – 4:16 (Brenda Russell, Mark Cawley)
 "Loving You Tonight" – 4:38 (Christopher Difford, Glenn Tilbrook)
 "Across from Midnight" – 4:57 (Leann White, Tony Joe White)
 "What Do You Say?" – 4:42 (Dean Grakal, Greg Sutton)
 "The Last One to Know" – 3:30 (Bob Thiele, Greg Sutton)
 "That's the Way Her Love Is" – 2:44 (Stephen Allen Davis)
 "Need Your Love So Bad" – 5:19 (Mertis John Jr.)

Personnel 

 Joe Cocker – lead vocals 
 Chris Stainton – acoustic piano (1, 2, 5, 8, 11, 12), Fender Rhodes (1, 3, 6-9), Hammond B3 organ (3, 4, 6, 7, 9)
 C. J. Vanston – synthesizers (1, 5, 8, 11), Fender Rhodes (1, 4, 8), Hammond B3 organ (2, 11), string arrangements (2), acoustic piano (4), accordion (4), synth strings (11)
 Steve Pigott – additional keyboards (3, 6, 7), keyboards (9)
  Garry Hughes – synthesizers (7), synth strings (7), keyboards (9, 10)
 Michael Landau – guitar (1, 2, 4, 5, 8)
 Dean Parks – guitar (1, 5, 8), 12 string guitar, wah wah guitar (2), acoustic guitar (4, 5), 
 Tim Pierce – guitar (1, 4, 5)
 Graham Lyle – acoustic guitar (3)
 Tim Renwick – guitar (3, 6, 12)
 Ronnie Johnson – guitar (7, 9)
 Glenn Tilbrook – guitar (7), backing vocals (7)
 Matt Backer – guitar (10)
 Nigel Spennewyn – guitar (10)
 Neil Stubenhaus – bass guitar (1, 5, 8)
 James "Hutch" Hutchinson – bass guitar (2, 4)
 Phil Spalding – bass guitar (3, 6, 7, 9, 10, 12), backing vocals (3, 6, 7, 9)
 John Robinson – drums (1, 5, 8)
 Kenny Aronoff – drums (2, 4)
 Geoff Dunn – drums (3, 6, 7, 9, 12)
 Rafael Padilla – percussion (1, 4, 5, 8)
 Luis Conte – percussion (2)
 Miles Bould – percussion (7, 9)
 Dick Marx – horn arrangements (2)
 Dan Higgins – saxophone (2)
 Jamie Talbot – saxophone (7, 9)
 Bill Reichenbach Jr. – trombone (2)
 Neil Sidwell – trombone (7)
 Gary Grant – trumpet (2)
 Jerry Hey – trumpet (2)
 Steve Sidwell – trumpet (7)
 Mark Feltham – harmonica (10)
 Nick Ingman – string arrangements (3)
 Joey Diggs – backing vocals (1, 5)
 Lamont Van Hook – backing vocals (1, 5)
 Fred White – backing vocals (1, 5)
 Alexandra Brown – backing vocals (2, 4, 8)
 Mortonette Jenkins – backing vocals (2, 4, 8)
 Marlena Jeter – backing vocals (2, 4, 8)
 Pete Smith – backing vocals (3, 6, 7, 9)
 Claudia Fontaine – backing vocals (6)
 Chris Difford – backing vocals (7)
 Tessa Niles – backing vocals (7)
 Juliet Roberts – backing vocals (10)

Production 

 Joe Cocker – executive producer (all tracks)
 Roger Davies – producer (tracks 1, 2, 4, 5, 8 & 11), executive producer (3, 6, 7, 9, 10 & 12), management.
 Chris Lord-Alge – producer,  recording and overdub engineer (tracks 1, 2, 4, 5, 8 & 11).
 C. J. Vanston – producer (track 2)
 Pete Smith – producer (tracks 3, 6, 7, 9 & 12), mixing (track 10).
 Garry Hughes – producer (track 10)
 Bob Thiele – producer (track 10)
 Andy Baker – engineer (track 10)
 Dave Burnham – engineer (track 10)
 Matt Howe – engineer and mixing (tracks 3, 6, 7, 9 & 12)
 Martin Dutasta – assistant engineer (tracks 3, 6, 7, 9 & 12)
 Lee Phillips – mix assistant (tracks 3, 6, 7, 9 & 12)
 Mike Dy – assistant engineer (tracks 1, 2, 4, 5, 8 & 11)
 A. Mixdorf – assistant engineer (tracks 1, 2, 4, 5, 8 & 11)
 Tony Cousins – mastering
 Doug Sax – mastering
 Norman Moore – art direction, design
 Greg Gorman – photography
 Michael Owens – tray photography

Charts

Weekly charts

Year-end charts

Certifications

References 

1997 albums
Joe Cocker albums
Albums produced by Bob Thiele
Albums produced by Chris Lord-Alge
CMC International albums